James Harrell may refer to:
James A. Harrell III (born 1971), aka Jim Harrell, Democratic politician
James Harrell (American football) (born 1957), former American college and professional football player
James Harrell (actor) (1918–2000), American actor
Jim Harrell Jr., Democratic nominee